Laan mig din kone is a 1957 Danish comedy film directed by Preben Neergaard and Anker Sørensen and starring Gunnar Lauring.

Cast
 Gunnar Lauring - Direktør Henrik Rudholm
 Anne Werner Thomsen - Susanne Rudholm
 Preben Mahrt - Salgschef Børge Lund
 Buster Larsen - Arkitekt Torben Einerts
 Lily Broberg - Ulla Einerts
 Christian Arhoff - Repræsentant Halfdan Knudsen
 Bodil Steen - Henriette Flint
 Ole Monty - Afdelingschef Thomsen
 Inga Løfgren - Fru Thomsen
 Knud Hallest - Afdelingschef Kjær
 Ellen Friis - Fru Kjær
 Bjørn Spiro - Politibetjenten
 Poul Reichhardt - Portieren
 Ego Brønnum-Jacobsen - Nielsen
 Ejnar Larsen - Hotelkarlen
 Jens Kjeldby - Kasserer Jørgensen
 Poul Bundgaard - Portieren
 Preben Uglebjerg - Fortælleren

External links

1957 films
1950s Danish-language films
1957 comedy films
Films directed by Preben Neergaard
Danish black-and-white films
Danish comedy films